Štefan Katušák (born 26 October 1949 in Poproč) is a former Czechoslovak/Slovak handball player who competed in the 1976 Summer Olympics.

In 1976 he was a squad member of the Czechoslovak team which finished seventh in the Olympic tournament. In years 2008 and 2009 he won the Slovak national title (part of WHIL) as the coach of the women's team of ŠKP Bratislava.

References 

1949 births
Living people
Czechoslovak male handball players
Slovak male handball players
Olympic handball players of Czechoslovakia
Handball players at the 1976 Summer Olympics